Margarita Klimenko (born 28 July 1979) is a Russian luger. She competed at the 1998 Winter Olympics and the 2002 Winter Olympics.

References

External links
 

1979 births
Living people
Russian female lugers
Olympic lugers of Russia
Lugers at the 1998 Winter Olympics
Lugers at the 2002 Winter Olympics
Sportspeople from Krasnoyarsk